Singapore Business Review is a business magazine that is published by Charlton Media Group. It has an audited circulation of 26,000 and a readership of 83,088 readers in Singapore and regionally. The magazine covers a wide array of topics and focuses on the Singaporean business landscape. The magazine covers conferences, roundtables and events held in Singapore that are related to the business environment in Singapore.

Web news
The website runs stories daily. Stories of popular interest, top 20 listed companies and important business news are reported as top stories.

Since 18 January 2010, the Singapore Business Review had begun rapid expansion into using social media platforms by using Facebook for fan pages and Twitter to communicate with its readers, amongst many other dissemination tools.

The Singapore Business Review publishes articles of importance to businesses in Singapore on Digg and StumbleUpon on a regular basis.

References

External links
 
 Charlton Media Group

2001 establishments in Singapore
Business magazines
Magazines established in 2001
Magazines published in Singapore